Mashabane is a South-African surname. Notable people with the surname include:

Maite Nkoana-Mashabane (born 1963), South African politician
Norman Mashabane (1956–2007), South African ambassador to Indonesia

Bantu-language surnames